William Thompson House may refer to:

 William H. Thompson Farmstead, East Windsor, Connecticut, listed on the NRHP in Hartford County, Connecticut
 William N. Thompson House, Indianapolis, Indiana, listed on the NRHP in Marion County, Indiana
 William Thompson House (Perryville, Kentucky), listed on the NRHP in Kentucky
 William Thompson House (Camden, Tennessee), listed on the NRHP in Tennessee
 William Thompson House (Beaver, Utah), listed on the NRHP in Utah
 Will H. Thompson House, Seattle, Washington, listed on the NRHP in Washington

See also
Thompson House (disambiguation)
William Thompson (disambiguation)